George Wallace Briggs (1875 – 30 December 1959) was an English hymn writer and Anglican clergyman.

Career
Briggs was born in Nottingham, the son of George Briggs and Betsy Ann Hardstaff, and educated at Loughborough Grammar School and Emmanuel College, Cambridge. He served as a padre in the Royal Navy from January 1902, before becoming Vicar of St Andrew's Church, Norwich, in 1909. In 1918 he became Rector of All Saints Church, Loughborough. Between 1927 and 1934 he was Canon of Leicester Cathedral and from 1934 until his retirement in 1956 he served as Canon of Worcester Cathedral.

His most famous hymn is "God Has Spoken by His Prophets" as set to the tune written for Ode to Joy by Beethoven.  He also wrote Loughborough Grammar School's school hymn "Our Father by whose servant(s)", which has also been adopted as a school hymn by other schools.  The servant in LGS's case was Thomas Burton, and the "Five Hundred Years Enduring" verse 2 (originally "Four Hundred Years Enduring") is unique to the Loughborough Schools Foundation. He also wrote the college hymn for Loughborough College of Technology, which would later become Loughborough University.

Owing to his writing of their school hymn, there is a room within Loughborough Schools Foundation's Music Department named after him.

Family
He married Constance Emily T Barrow in 1909, and had five children: Margaret, Joan, David, Ruth, and Stephen.

List of hymns 

 "A Call to the Free Nations"
 "A Hymn of Freedom"
 "Christ is the world's true Light"
 "Come, risen Lord, and deign to be our guest"
 "God Has Spoken by His Prophets"
 "God, you have given us power to sound"
 "Lord of All Majesty and Might"
 "Our Father by Whose Servant(s)"
 "Now is eternal life if ris'n with Christ we stand"

Bibliography
Daily Prayer co-edited by Eric Milner-White & G.W. Briggs, Pelican Books, 1959

References

External links
 

1875 births
1959 deaths
People educated at Loughborough Grammar School
Royal Navy chaplains
Alumni of Emmanuel College, Cambridge
People associated with Loughborough University
People from Nottingham